John Howard Riley (born 16 February 1943) is an English pianist and composer, who worked in jazz and experimental music idioms.

Riley was born in Huddersfield, Yorkshire, England.  He began learning the piano at the age of six, and began playing jazz as early as the age of 13. He studied at the University of Wales (1961–66), Indiana University in America under David Baker (1966–67), and then at York University (1967–70). Alongside his studies he played jazz professionally, with Evan Parker (1966) and then with his own trio (1967–76), with Barry Guy on bass and Alan Jackson, Jon Hiseman, and Tony Oxley for periods on drums. Additionally he worked with John McLaughlin (1968), the London Jazz Composers Orchestra (1970-1980s), and with Oxley's ensemble (1972–81). He and Guy worked in a trio with Phil Wachsmann from 1976 well into the 1980s, and played solo piano throughout North America and Europe. From 1978 to 1981, he played in a quartet with Guy, Trevor Watts, and John Stevens; in the early 1980s he did duo work with Keith Tippett, with Jaki Byard, and with Elton Dean. From 1985 he worked in a trio with Jeff Clyne and Tony Levin.

Riley has taught at the Guildhall School of Music and Drama and Goldsmiths, University of London, where he has taught since the 1970s.

Discography
 1968 Discussions (Opportunity)
 1969 Angle (CBS)
 1970 The Day Will Come (CBS)
 1971 Flight (Turtle)
 1974 Synopsis (Incus)
 1977 Shaped (Music for Solo Piano) (Mosaic)
 1977 Intertwine (Music for Two Pianos) (Mosaic)
 1978 The Toronto Concert (Vinyl Records)
 1979 The Other Side (Spotlite)
 1982 Duality (View)
 1984 For Four on Two Two (Affinity)
 1985 In Focus with Keith Tippett (Affinity)
 1987 Live at the Royal Festival Hall with Jaki Byard (Leo)
 1990 Procession (Wondrous Music)
 1993 Beyond Category (Wondrous)
 1993 The Heat of Moments (Wondrous)
 1994 The Bern Concert with Keith Tippett (FMR)
 1995 Wishing on the Moon with Castronari, Marsh (FMR)
 1997 Inner Minor (ASC)
 1998 Making Notes (Slam)
 1999 Short Stories
 1999 One to One with Elton Dean (Slam)
 2001 First Encounter with Keith Tippett (Jazzprint; recorded 1981)
 2001 Singleness (Jazzprint; recorded 1974)
 2001 Trisect (Jazzprint)
 2001 Air Play (Slam)
 2001 Overground (Emanem; recorded 1974–1975)
 2002 Organic with Barry Guy, John Stevens (Jazzprint)
 2002 Four in the Afternoon with Larry Stabbins, Mark Sanders, Tony Wren (Emanem)
 2003 Another Part of the Story with Keith Tippett, John Tilbury (Emanem)
 2003 Duology with Lol Coxhill (Slam)
 2004 Pianoforte with Keith Tippett, Grew, Thomas (Slam)
 2005 At Lincoln Cathedral (Heliopause)
 2005 Consequences (33 Jazz)
 2006 Four at St. Cyprians with Larry Stabbins, Mark Sanders, Tony Wren (FMR) 
 2006 Short Stories (Volume Two) (Slam)
 2006 Two Is One (Emanem)
 2009 The Monk & Ellington Sessions (33 Jazz) 
 2009 Three Is One (ASC)
 2010 Solo in Vilnius (NoBusiness)
 2012 St. Cyprians 2 with Larry Stabbins, Mark Sanders, Tony Wren (FMR)
 2012 St. Cyprians 3 with Philipp Wachsmann, Tony Wren (FMR)
 2013 Live with Repertoire (NoBusiness)
 2014 To Be Continued (Slam)
 2015 10.11.12 (NoBusiness)
 2015 R&B with Jaki Byard (Slam)
 2018 Live in the USA (NoBusiness)
 2018 Listen to Hear (Slam)

As sideman
With Barry Guy/The London Jazz Composers' Orchestra
 1972 Ode (Incus)
 1988 Zurich Concerts (Intakt)
 1989 Harmos (Intakt)
 1990 Double Trouble (Intakt)

With Paul Rutherford and Iskra 1912
 1997 Sequences 72 & 73 (Emanem)

References

Other sources
Ed Hazell, "Howard Riley". The New Grove Dictionary of Jazz.

Academics of Goldsmiths, University of London
Academics of the Guildhall School of Music and Drama
Alumni of the University of Wales
Alumni of the University of York
British jazz pianists
Indiana University alumni
Musicians from Huddersfield
Emanem Records artists
1943 births
Living people
21st-century pianists
Incus Records artists
FMR Records artists
NoBusiness Records artists